Dalia Djebbar (born April 6, 1996, Béjaïa, Algeria), is an Algerian female volleyball player.

Club information
Current club :  ASW Bejaia

References

1996 births
Volleyball players from Béjaïa
Living people
Algerian women's volleyball players
Setters (volleyball)
21st-century Algerian people